Disclave was a science fiction convention run by the Washington Science Fiction Association (WSFA) in or near Washington, D.C., in the spring of nearly every year from 1950 through 1997. By many counts, it was the third-oldest science fiction convention.

At first it was intermittent and small, with an attendance as low as 22 people (in 1953). From 1965 on, it happened every year. From 1971 on, it lasted the three days of Memorial Day weekend. For a notable section of the SF community, that weekend was considered Disclave's; even after the final session, several years passed before a similar mid-Atlantic group (Balticon) began meeting on Memorial Day.

The highest attendance was 1485 (in 1979), 85 more members than in 1981 when Isaac Asimov was the Guest of Honor. Some other Guests of Honor have been Lois McMaster Bujold, Gene Wolfe, George R. R. Martin, Connie Willis and William Gibson. Notable chairs were Jay Haldeman, Alexis A. Gilliland and Jack Chalker.

In the early 1990s, more and more non-members of Disclave came to the hotel in conjunction with the convention.

In 1997, a fire sprinkler was broken, flooding much of the hotel. Although an investigation determined that neither Disclave nor WSFA were responsible, "the Disclave flood" was forever associated with the convention. The 1998 Disclave, scheduled for a different hotel on a different weekend, was canceled six weeks before the convention by the hotel. The 1997 convention was the last Disclave.

After Disclave, WSFA planned the structure and focus of their next convention. The first Capclave was held in 2001.

List of Disclaves

References

External links
 Disclave website

Culture of Washington, D.C.
Defunct science fiction conventions in the United States
Recurring events established in 1950
Recurring events disestablished in 1997
1950 establishments in Washington, D.C.
1997 disestablishments in Washington, D.C.